The National Republican Party of Russia (NRPR; ; Natsionalno-respublikanskaya partiya Rossii, NRPR), before 1991 Republican People's Party of Russia (RPPR; ; Respublikanskaya narodnaya partiya Rossii, RNPR), was a far-right nationalist party in Russia, that was founded in 1990 in Leningrad by Nikolay Lysenko. It was one of the most influential Russian radical nationalist parties of the time. The party supported constructing in Russia a unitary state and a mononational society with an economy of the "Chinese type" with a mandatory suppression of all forms of "cosmopolitism" and "internationalism".

The militants of the National Republican Party of Russia who formed the Russian National Legion took part in the War in Transnistria on the side of the separatists and the Yugoslav wars on the Serbian side. 6 party members were killed in the war. The party belonged to the united national-communist National Salvation Front. The National Republican Party could not participate in the 1993 State Duma election as it failed to gather the necessary 6 000 signatures of supporters but its leader Lysenko ran in the Saratov single-mandate constituency and was elected to the State Duma. At the 4th party congress on 3 December 1994 the party split into two factions. In 1995 the party run in the State Duma election but disintegrated after the arrest of Nikolay Lysenko in 1996. NRPR was officially de-registered on 31 December 1998. The Yuri Belyayev faction re-registered in 2000 as the new far-right Freedom Party.

References

1990 establishments in Russia
1998 disestablishments in Russia
Anti-communist organizations in Russia
Anti-communist parties
Defunct far-right parties
Defunct nationalist parties in Russia
Far-right political parties in Russia
Political parties disestablished in 1998
Political parties established in 1990
Russian nationalist parties